Foreign may refer to:

Government
 Foreign policy, how a country interacts with other countries
 Ministry of Foreign Affairs, in many countries
 Foreign Office, a department of the UK government
 Foreign office and foreign minister
 United States state law, a legal matter in another state

Science and technology
 Foreign accent syndrome, a side effect of severe brain injury
 Foreign key, a constraint in a relational database

Arts and entertainment
 Foreign film or world cinema, films and film industries of non-English-speaking countries
 Foreign music or world music
 Foreign literature or world literature
 Foreign Policy, a magazine

Music
 "Foreign", a song by Jessica Mauboy from her 2010 album Get 'Em Girls
 "Foreign" (Trey Songz song), 2014
 "Foreign", a song by Lil Pump from the album Lil Pump

Other uses
 Foreign corporation, a corporation that can do business outside its jurisdiction
 Foreign language, a language not spoken by the people of a certain place

See also
 Foreigner (disambiguation)